Ivan the Terrible is an American sitcom that was broadcast on CBS as a summer replacement series in 1976.

The series parodied American attitudes toward the Soviet Union during the height of the Cold War. Set in Moscow, the sitcom starred Lou Jacobi as a Russian hotel waiter named Ivan Petrovsky and the day-to-day misadventures of Ivan's family plus their Cuban exchange student boarder; all of whom live in a cramped, one-bedroom apartment.  (The one bedroom being occupied by the family's extremely vicious and feral Russian wolfhound, "Rasputin", who was frequently heard barking and growling, despite the fact that this is almost unheard of behavior for that breed of dog, but never seen.)

Also appearing in this series were Christopher Hewett, Phil Leeds, Alan Cauldwell, Despo Diamantidou, and, in her TV series debut, Nana Visitor (here billed under her birth name, Nana Tucker).  Harvey Korman appeared as a Soviet bureaucrat in an uncredited cameo at the close of each episode.

Only five episodes of Ivan the Terrible were broadcast on CBS during the late summer of 1976. Alan King was the series' executive producer.

References

External links
 

CBS original programming
1970s American sitcoms
1976 American television series debuts
1976 American television series endings
Television shows set in Moscow